Momox AG is a Berlin-based recommerce site for used books and media founded by Christian Wegner in 2004.

Wegner has said that "momox" stands for "Moderner Medien Online Express-Ankauf".

In May 2006, he founded Momox GmbH and the momox.de web site for buying books, CDs, and DVDs. The selling site Medimops opened in 2007.

In 2010, other investors joined the company. The company expanded to France, Austria, and Great Britain in 2011. In 2019, Momox had €250 million in sales.

, the majority owner is Verdane Capital of Norway, and Wegner has sold all his shares.

Due to Brexit, the company had to discontinue its service on momox.co.uk in December 2021.

In 2022, there was an expansion of the offering to Spain and Italy. On December 14, 2022, there was a transformation from a stock corporation to a European company.

See also
List of online booksellers

Notes

External links
 momox.de, buyer of used books
 medimops.de, seller of used books
 momoxfashion.com, seller of used clothes

Companies based in Berlin
Book selling websites
German companies established in 2006
Bookstores established in the 21st century
Retail companies established in 2006
2006 establishments in Germany
Momox